The Atwood Gibson Writers' Trust Fiction Prize, formerly known as the Rogers Writers' Trust Fiction Prize, is a Canadian literary award presented by the Writers' Trust of Canada after an annual juried competition of works submitted by publishers. Alongside the Governor General's Award for English-language fiction and the Giller Prize, it is considered one of the three main awards for Canadian fiction in English. Its eligibility criteria allow for it to garland collections of short stories as well as novels.

The award was first presented in 1997. It was renamed in January 2021, in order to honour the Canadian writers Margaret Atwood and Graeme Gibson. Concurrently with the renaming, the prize package was increased from $50,000 to $60,000, matching the amount currently presented by its sibling, the Hilary Weston Writers' Trust Prize for Nonfiction. The prize is sponsored by Jim Balsillie.

Nominees and recipients

References

External links
 Rogers Writers' Trust Fiction Prize, official website

Writers' Trust of Canada awards
Awards established in 1997
1997 establishments in Canada
Canadian fiction awards